Stratford is a city on the Avon River within Perth County in southwestern Ontario, Canada, with a 2016 population of 31,465 in a land area of . Stratford is the seat of Perth County, which was settled by English, Irish, Scottish and German immigrants, in almost equal numbers, starting in the 1820s but primarily in the 1830s and 1840s. Most became farmers; even today, the area around Stratford is known for mixed farming, dairying and hog production.

The area was settled in 1832, and the town and river were named after Stratford-upon-Avon, England. Stratford was incorporated as a town in 1859 and as a city in 1886. The first mayor was John Corry Wilson Daly and the current mayor is Martin Ritsma. The swan has become a symbol of the city. Each year twenty-four white swans are released into the Avon River. The town is noted for the Stratford Festival, which performs Shakespearean plays and other genres from May to October.

History 
Before European settlement, many Indigenous groups called this land home: the Anishinaabe, Attiwonderonk (Neutral) and Haudenosaunee peoples. 

In 1832, the development of an area called "Little Thames" as the market centre for the eastern Huron Tract began. By 1834 a tavern, sawmill and grist mill had opened, and by 1835 a post office, called Stratford, was operating. The Smith's Canadian Gazetteer of 1846 describes Stratford as follows: "Stratford contains about 200 inhabitants. Post Office, post three times a-week. Professions and Trades.—Two physicians and surgeons, one grist and saw mill, one tannery, three stores, one brewery, one distillery, one ashery, two
taverns, two blacksmiths, one saddler, two wheelwrights, three shoemakers, two
tailors. Settlement was slow until the early 1850s when the railway arrived.

Furniture manufacturing and railway locomotive repairs were the most important parts of the local economy by the twentieth century. In 1933 a general strike, started by the furniture workers and led by the Communist Workers' Unity League, marked the last time the army was deployed to break a strike in Canada. The Grand Trunk Railway (later CNR) locomotive repair shops were the major employer for many years, employing 40% of the population.

Timeline 
 1828 - Settlement begins.
 1832 - Thomas Mercer Jones, an agent of the Canada Company, names the village "Stratford" and renames the portion of the Thames River running through it the "Avon River." The first sawmill, hotel (Shakespeare Hotel) and gristmill are opened.
 1834 - The community has a tavern, sawmill and grist mill; in 1835 the first post office opens.
 1849 - The Perth County News is Stratford's first weekly newspaper.
 1853 - Perth County is created, with Stratford as its county seat.
 1854 - Stratford is incorporated as a village.
 1856 - Stratford becomes a railway town with the arrival of the Grand Trunk and Buffalo-Lake Huron railways. 
 1859 - Stratford is incorporated as a town.
 1864 - The 17-year-old American telegraph operator Thomas Edison briefly lived at 19 Grange Street.
 1871 - A major railway repair yard opens (the town's major employer by 1901) and helps accelerate the population growth.
 1885 - Stratford is incorporated as a city with a population of 9,000.
 1887 - The second and current Perth County Court House opens; it is praised for its High Victorian architecture, with several Queen Anne features, and Richardsonian Romanesque elements.
 1898 - The massive red brick town hall, in the Victorian "Picturesque" style, with a prominent clock tower, is completed.
 1903 - The first public library opens, built with $15,000 of financial assistance from American steel magnate Andrew Carnegie.
 1908 - The Stratford Normal School opens to train teachers; from 1953 on, it is called the Stratford Teachers' College. The school trains nearly 14,000 teachers before closing in 1973.
 1909 - The GTR (later CNR) locomotive repair shops building is completed; it is 16,800 square meters (182,000 square feet) in size.
 1918 - A gift from J.C. Garden, a pair of mute swans come to live in Stratford. The swan population would expand over subsequent years.
 1920s - Stratford is already a major furniture manufacturing centre; nearly one-sixth of all the furniture made in Canada is shipped from here. (All such manufacturing will have ceased by 2006.)
 1933 - The army is called in to attempt to end a general strike (mostly of furniture workers) and try to systematically remove communist leaders, but fails, the last time the military is used to quell a strike in Canada.
 1936 - The Shakespearean Gardens are created, primarily through the efforts of R, Thomas Orr.
 1953 - The Stratford Shakespearean Festival Theatre is opened through the efforts of a Stratford journalist, Tom Patterson.
 1957 - The Festival moves into its first permanent structure, the Festival Theatre.
 1964 - The CNR shops close, laying off numerous employees.
 1976 - The Stratford City Hall is designated a National Historic Site of Canada.
 1979 - an F4 tornado tore through the community, travelling for 39 kilometers and levelling several houses.
 1992 - Stratford Armoury is recognised as a Federal Heritage building on the Register of the Government of Canada Heritage Buildings.
 1993 - Stratford's former Canadian National Railways (VIA Rail) Station is designated a Federal Heritage building.
 1997 - Nations in Bloom crowns Stratford the "Prettiest City in the World."
 2003 - The Stratford Festival of Canada celebrated its 50th season, welcoming 672,924 patrons to 18 plays. This was a record number of playgoers during the 50 seasons. The Avon Theatre realised a complete renewal and the Studio Theatre, a fourth theatre space seating 250 people, was added.

Geography

Climate
Stratford has a humid continental climate type (Köppen: Dfb). Stratford has warm summers that are lengthy by Canadian standards with cool nights and long, cold, and snowy winters. Precipitation is very high year round.

Demographics

Economy 
The city is in a successful agricultural area and has some auto parts manufacturing, but tourism is still the most significant aspect. According to an estimate by the Conference Board of Canada, it generates $140 million in economic activity, $65 million in taxes and 3,000 direct and indirect jobs. For the past few years however, the town has been working to attract more technical industries with former Mayor Dan Mathieson spearheading the effort. The Royal Bank of Canada opened a $300 million data centre here, Starwood Hotels is experimenting with a new type of call centre, and the University of Waterloo has opened a satellite campus with about 500 students specializing in digital media and information technology, and as the home of the technology forum Canada 3.0 and various technology companies.

Arts and culture

Stratford Festival 

The Stratford Shakespeare Festival began in 1953 when, on July 13, actor Alec Guinness spoke the first lines of the first play produced by the festival.

The performances during the first four seasons took place in a concrete amphitheatre covered by giant canvas tent on the banks of the River Avon. The first of many years of Stratford Shakespeare Festival production history started with a six-week season, opening on 13 July 1953, with Richard III and then All's Well That Ends Well both starring Alec Guinness. The 1954 season ran for nine weeks and included Sophocles’ Oedipus Rex and two Shakespeare plays, Measure for Measure and The Taming of the Shrew. Young actors during the first four seasons included several who went on to great success in subsequent years, Douglas Campbell, Timothy Findley, Don Harron, William Hutt and Douglas Rain.
 
The new Festival Theatre was dedicated on 30 June 1957, with seating for over 1,800 people; none are more than 65 feet from the thrust stage. Over the years, additional theatrical venues were added: the Avon Theatre, the Tom Patterson Theatre (originally Shakespeare 3 Company) and the Studio Theatre. The annual festival now draws hundreds of thousands of theatre goers and tourists to the area each year. Acclaimed actors including Alec Guinness, Christopher Plummer, Dame Maggie Smith, William Hutt, Martha Henry and William Shatner have performed at the festival. The Canadian novelist and playwright Timothy Findley performed in the first season, and had an ongoing relationship with the festival, eventually moving to Stratford in 1997.

From 1956 to 1961 and 1971 to 1976, the Stratford Festival also staged the separate Stratford Film Festival, which was credited as one of the first North American film festivals ever to schedule international films. That festival collapsed after the 1976 launch of the Festival of Festivals, now known as the Toronto International Film Festival, impacted both the Stratford Film Festival's funding and its audience.

Music 
The Stratford Summer Music Festival has been held for seven seasons and features indoor and outdoor performances by international, classical, and world music artists as well as young Canadian performers around downtown Stratford.

The Stratford Concert Band, a local wind ensemble, was founded as the Grand Trunk Railway Employees Band, and renamed the Canadian National Railway Employees' Band in 1907. The band performs free outdoor concerts at the Kiwanis Pavilion Bandshell in Upper Queen's in the summer.

Pride and the 2SLGBTQIA+ Community 
Stratford is home to year-round 2SLGBTQIA+ programming and events. 

Since 2018, Stratford has been home to pride festivities during the month of June (for Pride Month). Planned and implemented by Stratford-Perth Pride, pride month in Stratford typically includes a pride parade, drag show, family-friendly pride in the park event, and flag raisings. In November 2021, Stratford-Perth Pride launched its first annual Trans Pride Week - a week of celebrations honouring the trans and nonbinary community. 

Stratford is also home to the Stratford Pride Community Centre (SPCC). The SPCC is a physical space located in downtown Stratford for the 2SLGBTQIA+ community to visit during drop-in hours and attend social events. The SPCC also hosts Stratford's Winter Pride event which takes place in February of each year.

Attractions
Numerous visitors arrive in Stratford each week during the May to October Festival season. National Geographic Traveler considers the theatres to be "nirvana" and also praises other aspects of the town. "During the festival—which stages everything from Shakespeare to Sondheim to new Canadian plays—you can stay in theater-themed B&Bs, hang out with actors post-show at local bars like Down the Street, go on backstage tours, and attend dozens of other events with other theater-mad folk. Stratford itself is the type of walkable wholesome town Rodgers and Hammerstein might write a musical about."

In addition to the festival, several annual events attract visitors. Stratford Summer Music, in its 17th year, runs for about a month. In 2016, the event, run by the town, offered 85 concerts, a third of them free or "pay what you can". The 2016 budget was $800,000 with funding provided by agencies such as the Ontario Cultural Attractions Fund. Smaller event are held in other months, including winter and the Swan Weekend in April, to attract off-season visitors.

Fans of Stratford-born musician Justin Bieber frequently visit the town, and Stratford Tourism has produced a "Bieber-iffic Map" showing sites associated with his life in Stratford. In 2018, the Stratford Perth Museum opened "Steps to Stardom," an exhibit documenting Bieber's early career in Stratford.

Sports
Stratford is home of the OHA Midwestern Junior B hockey team, the Stratford Warriors. The Warriors have produced notable NHL players such as Ed Olczyk, Craig Hartsburg, Garth Snow, Rob Blake, Chris Pronger, Nelson Emerson, Tim Taylor, Greg de Vries, Jeff Halpern, Rem Murray and Boyd Devereaux and won several Sutherland Cup championships. Stratford hosted Tim Hortons Hockey Day in Canada on January 30, 2010. Stratford used to also have an Intercounty Baseball League Team called the Stratford Nationals, and a soccer team in the Kitchener and District Soccer League. House League sports are also available in the Stratford area. There is the Stratford Rotary Hockey League, Hoops For Fun Basketball, Stratford Minor Baseball, the Stratford Soccer House League and the Stratford Dragon Boat Club. It’s the home of the Stratford Sabrecats, and Stratford is also home to the Black Swans rugby club.
The Chess Federation of Canada has its administrative office in Stratford.

Government
The city is governed by an elected city council, with a mayor and ten councilors, elected every four years. Sub-committees of council make recommendations to the standing committees of council that are then forwarded to city council for a final decision. The current mayor is Martin Ritsma.

Police
The city is served by the Stratford Police Service. The police board consists of two members of city council, a citizen appointed by council, and two citizens appointed by the Lieutenant Governor of Ontario. Stratford's first constable was hired in 1854. As of 2018, the Police Service has 56 sworn members and 22 civilians.

Other areas of Perth County receive services from the Ontario Provincial Police, Perth County Detachment in Sebringville with satellite offices in Listowel and Mitchell.

Infrastructure

Transportation
Historically, the city was a railway junction. Today, the Canadian National Railway, and the Goderich-Exeter Railway provide freight links, and Via Rail Canada is the passenger carrier. VIA's rail service in Stratford is based from the Stratford railway station, and is situated on the Toronto–Sarnia segment of the Québec City-Windsor Corridor; Via serves Stratford with four trains daily (two eastbound to Toronto Union Station, one westbound to Sarnia via London, and one westbound terminating at London). Also GO Transit provides service from Toronto to London as a pilot project. Whilst not on the 400-series highway, it is at the junctions of Highways 7 (Ontario St.), 8 (Huron St.), and former 19 (Now Perth Road 119, Mornington St.) and is connected to Highway 401 by expressways from Kitchener. Greyhound Canada provided daily service between London and Kitchener but the route was cancelled as of July 2011. The owners of Cherrey Bus Lines, Robin Hood Tours provides chartered bus service from Stratford to locations as far as Kincardine and Wingham. Within the city, Stratford Transit provides the local bus service, running every half-hour six days a week. The Stratford Municipal Airport (CYSA) is located just north of the city provides general aviation only with the closest full service airports in Waterloo (Region of Waterloo International Airport) and London (London International Airport).

Public transportation 
All bus routes in Stratford begin and end at the transit terminal located on Downie Street close to the downtown core. The terminal is home to eight bus bays and public washrooms. There are six regular routes that run for six days a week, Monday through Saturday, from 08:00 to 22:00. There is an additional industrial route that serves the Wright Business Park in the south end and industrial zones in the east end. There is bus service on Sundays however, there are no set routes. Instead, the city uses a transit on demand model where riders book a pickup and drop-off location by either calling, using an app, or accessing the city's website. There are special school routes in the morning and afternoon intended for students at the two local high schools and intermediate school. With four lines in the am and pm, these routes serve over 400,000 students a year. There is no service on public holidays.

Education
Public education in Stratford is provided by the Avon Maitland District School Board and Huron-Perth Catholic District School Board with both boards offering education in English, as well as French immersion up to grade eight (with the public Avon Maitland board also offering both languages through high school). The city has two secondary schools: Stratford District Secondary School, and St. Michael's Catholic Secondary School.

Stratford is also home to the Stratford Chef School, a prestigious culinary school and the focus of the Food Network Canada series Chef School.

University of Waterloo Stratford School

Founded in June 2009, the University of Waterloo Stratford School of Interaction Design and Business is part of the faculty of arts, established to provide programs that focus on digital media, digital technologies, content creation and user experience. September 2010 marked the official opening of the Stratford campus.

This location offers undergraduate, graduate and advanced education programs and research opportunities as well as opportunities for research and commercialization.

Stratford District Secondary School
The building was founded in 1963 under the name Stratford Northwestern. The name was changed in 2020 along with Stratford Intermediate School (formerly known as Stratford Central).

St. Michael Catholic School
Founded in 1990, St. Michael is the only Catholic high school in Stratford but is one of five Catholic schools in Stratford.

Media

Newspapers 
 The Beacon Herald
 SNAP Perth
 The Stratford Gazette - This newspaper closed in November, 2017.

Magazines
"Stratford Living Quarterly Magazine" www.stratfordliving.ca
"Stratford Living Seasons"

Radio 
 CJCS-FM 107.1 FM
 CHGK-FM 107.7 FM

Notable people

Actors

Cynthia Dale
Colm Feore
Graham Greene
Joe Dinicol
Shawn Roberts
 Sheila McCarthy

Musicians

Dayna Manning
John Till
Loreena McKennitt
Richard Manuel
Ron Sexsmith
Esthero
Justin Bieber, pop music singer/songwriter
James Westman, classical singer

Sports
Craig Hartsburg, retired NHL player and former NHL head coach
Tim Taylor, retired NHL player was born in Stratford
Jared McCann, currently plays for the Seattle Kraken of the NHL
Greg de Vries, retired NHL player, resides part-time in Stratford
Jacob Middleton, NHL player currently with the San Jose Sharks
Joey Hishon, retired NHL player
Nick Libett, retired NHL player
Steve Miller, retired NHL linesman
Rem Murray, retired NHL player
Julia Wilkinson, Canadian Olympic swimmer

Other
R. J. Anderson, author
 Tom Patterson, founder of the Stratford Festival. Patterson also helped found the Canadian Theatre Centre and the National Theatre School.
 Richard Monette, artistic director of the Stratford Festival of Canada from 1994 to 2007.
David Ridgen, filmmaker, podcast host of Someone Knows Something born in Stratford 
Peter Mansbridge, journalist, former CBC chief news anchor
Lloyd Robertson, news anchor
Tony Parsons, news anchor
William D. Connor, Lieutenant Governor of Wisconsin from 1907–1909
Thomas Edison briefly worked as a telegraph operator in 1863 for the Grand Trunk Railway at Stratford's railway station at age 16
John Davis Barnett, Assistant Mechanical Superintendent of the Grand Trunk Railroad and Mechanical Superintendent of the Midland Railway and librarian.
 Michael G. Turnbull, the assistant architect of the United States Capitol, was born in Stratford and lived there until the age of eleven, when his family emigrated to the United States. 
 Norman Bethune made Stratford his temporary home in the early part of 1917. 
 Robert B. Salter 
 Agnes Macphail, the first woman to be elected member of the House of Commons of Canada, attended teachers college in Stratford in 1909–10.
Jennie Kidd Trout, first woman in Canada to become a licensed medical doctor

Sister cities
Stratford is a member of the Stratford Sister Cities program which was created to promote friendship and cultural exchange between participating countries. Participation is restricted to places called "Stratford" that have a Shakespeare Theatre or Festival. A reunion is held every second year by a different member.

The five principal sister cities of Stratford, Ontario, are:
  Stratford upon Avon, England, United Kingdom, is namesake of the city
  Stratford, Victoria, Australia
  Stratford, New Zealand
  Stratford, Connecticut, United States
  Stratford, Prince Edward Island, Canada

References

External links 

 
Cities in Ontario
Single-tier municipalities in Ontario